Otto Froitzheim and Oscar Kreuzer defeated Harold Kitson and Charles Winslow in the final, 4–6, 6–2, 6–1, 6–3 to win the inaugural Men's Doubles tennis title at the World Hard Court Championships.

Draw

Draw

References

Men's Singles